Károly Weichelt (Also spelled Carol Weichelt, 2 March 1906 – 4 July 1971) was a Romanian international footballer, who played as a midfielder.

Biography 
Weichelt spent his career in Liga I with Clubul Atletic Oradea.

With the Romania national football team, he was selected by joint coaches Josef Uridil and Costel Rădulescu to take part in the 1934 World Cup in Italy. The team was eliminated in the first round after a 2–1 defeat to Czechoslovakia. He made one appearance for the national team in 1924, in a friendly which ended with a 4–1 loss against Czechoslovakia.

References

External links

1906 births
1971 deaths
Romania international footballers
Romanian footballers
CA Oradea players
1934 FIFA World Cup players
Association football midfielders
Sportspeople from Oradea